Daniel James Miller (born June 30, 1981) is an American former mixed martial artist. A professional from 2005 until 2014, he is perhaps best known for competing in the UFC, but was also the final International Fight League Middleweight Champion, representing the New York Pitbulls. He is the older brother of current UFC Lightweight Jim Miller.

Background
Born and raised in Sparta Township, New Jersey along with two brothers, Miller began wrestling from a young age and continued competing at Sparta High School. Miller then began his mixed martial arts career in 2005, when he began training at Planet Jiu-Jitsu. On January 15, 2010, Miller received his Brazilian jiu-jitsu black belt under Jamie Cruz.

Mixed martial arts career

Early career
Miller had his first professional fight November 19, 2005 against Tenyeh Dixon at Reality Fighting 10 and was victorious by triangle choke in the first round. Miller followed the Dixon fight with a victory over Jay Coleman at Reality Fighting 11 by Armbar, setting up a #1 contender match against Mike Massenzio. As the main event at Reality Fighting 12, Massenzio and Miller fought to a close decision, with Miller's submission attempts earning the victory on one judge's card and Massenzio's strong takedowns earning the victory on two cards, and the fight.

Miller's next fight came at the Cage Fury Fighting Championships where he took on Dave Perez. Miller landed a strong upkick from his back early before controlling the rest of the fight. Perez failed to answer the bell for round 2, and Miller's victory earned him a title shot at CFFC II.  Miller fought Lance Everson at CFFC II for the Cage Fury Fighting Championships Middleweight Title. The fight was highlighted by a powerful slam by Miller which led to a rear-naked choke which earned Miller the first round victory and the title.

Following CFFC II, Planet Jiu Jitsu closed down. Miller began training at American Martial Arts in Whippany, New Jersey with his brother Jim in January, 2007.

Miller defended his title April 13, 2007 against Rhino Fight Team's Jose Rodriguez in his first fight with AMA Fight Club. Miller's brother Jim also fought on the card; the first time the brothers had fought together since Reality Fighting 12 and both were victorious. Using his strong wrestling and Jiu Jitsu skills, Miller took Rodriguez to the ground on multiple occasions, and dealt damage from on top. Though Miller attained the mount twice, and had an attempted Armbar in the third round, Rodriguez proved to be tough and the fight went to the judges where Miller was granted the unanimous 30–27 victory.

Miller made his IFL debut when he fought for Renzo Gracie's New York Pitbulls in the 2007 IFL Semifinals in East Rutherford, New Jersey, filling in for the injured Fabio Leopaldo.  Miller fought the Tokyo Sabres' Dave Phillips in the first fight between the teams. After a quick slam by Miller, Phillips established guard and attempted an armbar. Miller slammed out, and in the scramble secured Phillips' neck in a standing guillotine choke. IFL Commentator Bas Rutten called the choke, which rendered Phillips unconscious, "the tightest guillotine [he'd] ever seen," and Miller earned the Submission-of-the-Night award for it.

Miller defeated Ryan McGivern by kneebar to become the last IFL Middleweight Championship.

Ultimate Fighting Championship
On July 23, 2008, it was announced that the UFC had signed both Miller and his brother Jim each to four fight contracts. Miller was successful in his UFC debut against Rob Kimmons at UFC Fight Night: Diaz vs. Neer, winning via rear-naked choke submission.

Miller returned to the Octagon and defeated Matt Horwich via unanimous decision at UFC 90 on October 25, 2008. He moved his UFC record to 3–0 with a first round submission victory over Jake Rosholt at UFC Fight Night: Lauzon vs. Stephens on February 7, 2009.

Originally, Miller was scheduled to fight again at UFC 98 against Yushin Okami, but Okami sustained an injury and was replaced by Chael Sonnen. He lost via unanimous decision as Sonnen took him down at will and ground and pounded for three rounds en route to a victory.

Miller was scheduled to fight CB Dollaway on September 16, 2009 at UFC Fight Night 19, but got an infection and had to withdraw.

Miller lost a unanimous decision to Demian Maia on February 6, 2010 at UFC 109.

Miller next lost his third consecutive UFC fight to Michael Bisping via unanimous decision on May 29, 2010 at UFC 114.

Miller faced John Salter on August 28, 2010 at UFC 118, replacing an injured Phil Baroni. Miller earned a much needed win via submission due to a Ninja Choke (a front Rear Naked Choke) at 1:53 of the second round. It was Miller's first victory since February 2009.

Miller next defeated Joe Doerksen on December 11, 2010 at UFC 124 via split decision.

Miller faced Nate Marquardt on March 19, 2011 at UFC 128, replacing Yoshihiro Akiyama on one week's notice. He lost the fight via unanimous decision.

Miller faced Rousimar Palhares on August 27, 2011 at UFC 134, replacing an injured Alexandre Ferreira. In the first round, Dan was dropped by strikes, Palhares followed up with ground and pound; using effective blocking and intelligent defense, Miller was able to protect himself from the strikes but Palhares stopped his ground and pound to begin celebrating and climbed on top of the cage ring. Ref Herb Dean pulled Palhares back into the ring and advised that he did not stop the fight. Before continuing, both fighters reset and met in the middle of the ring; Dan Miller immediately dropped Palhares with a hard punch. Palhares even went limp as he fell to the canvas, but quickly regained composure. Palhares ended up defeating Miller by unanimous decision.

Miller faced Ricardo Funch in a Welterweight bout on June 22, 2012 at UFC on FX 4. Miller was successful his welterweight debut, submitting Funch with a guillotine choke late in round 3, earning Submission of the Night honors.

Miller was expected to face Sean Pierson on September 22, 2012 at UFC 152.  However, Miller pulled out of the bout after getting news about his son's kidney transplant operation  and was replaced by Lance Benoist.

Miller returned to the UFC octagon on March 16, 2013 at UFC 158, where he faced Jordan Mein on the card. He lost the fight via TKO in the first round, the first stoppage loss of his career.

Miller was expected to return to middleweight and face Daniel Sarafian on December 20, 2014 at UFC Fight Night 58.  However, Miller pulled out of the bout on December 11 and was replaced by promotional newcomer Antonio dos Santos Jr.

After over two years away from the sport, Miller returned to face Trevor Smith on July 12, 2015 at The Ultimate Fighter 21 Finale. He lost the fight via unanimous decision and was subsequently released from the promotion.

Personal life
Miller is married. The couple lost their first child, a daughter in March 2009. Their second child has struggled with health problems. Prior to their careers in mixed martial arts, Dan and his younger brother Jim worked in construction with their father.

Championships and accomplishments
Ultimate Fighting Championship
Submission of the Night (One time) vs. Ricardo Funch 
Cage Fury Fighting Championships
CFFC Middleweight Championship (One time)
One successful title defense
International Fight League
IFL Middleweight Championship (One time)

Mixed martial arts record 

|-
|Loss
|align=center|14–8 (1)
|Trevor Smith
|Decision (unanimous)
|The Ultimate Fighter: American Top Team vs. Blackzilians Finale 
|
|align=center|3
|align=center|5:00
|Las Vegas, Nevada, United States
|
|-
|Loss
|align=center| 14–7 (1)
|Jordan Mein
|TKO (punches)
|UFC 158
|
|align=center|1
|align=center|4:42
|Montreal, Quebec, Canada
|
|-
|Win
|align=center| 14–6 (1)
|Ricardo Funch
|Submission (guillotine choke)
|UFC on FX: Maynard vs. Guida
|
|align=center|3
|align=center|3:12
|Atlantic City, New Jersey, United States
|
|-
|Loss
|align=center| 13–6 (1)
|Rousimar Palhares
|Decision (unanimous)
|UFC 134
|
|align=center|3
|align=center|5:00 
|Rio de Janeiro, Brazil
| 
|-
|Loss
|align=center|13–5 (1)
|Nate Marquardt
|Decision (unanimous)
|UFC 128
|
|align=center|3
|align=center|5:00
|Newark, New Jersey, United States
|
|-
|Win
|align=center|13–4 (1)
|Joe Doerksen
|Decision (split)
|UFC 124
|
|align=center|3
|align=center|5:00
|Montreal, Quebec, Canada
|
|-
|Win
|align=center|12–4 (1)
|John Salter
|Submission (guillotine choke)
|UFC 118
|
|align=center|2
|align=center|1:53
|Boston, Massachusetts, United States
|
|-
|Loss
|align=center|11–4 (1)
|Michael Bisping
|Decision (unanimous)
|UFC 114
|
|align=center|3
|align=center|5:00
|Las Vegas, Nevada, United States
|
|-
|Loss
|align=center|11–3 (1)
|Demian Maia
|Decision (unanimous)
|UFC 109
|
|align=center|3
|align=center|5:00
|Las Vegas, Nevada, United States
|
|-
|Loss
|align=center|11–2 (1)
|Chael Sonnen
|Decision (unanimous)
|UFC 98
|
|align=center|3
|align=center|5:00
|Las Vegas, Nevada, United States
|
|-
|Win
|align=center|11–1 (1)
|Jake Rosholt
|Submission (guillotine choke)
|UFC Fight Night: Lauzon vs. Stephens
|
|align=center|1
|align=center|1:03
|Tampa, Florida, United States
|
|-
|Win
|align=center|10–1 (1)
|Matt Horwich
|Decision (unanimous)
|UFC 90
|
|align=center|3
|align=center|5:00
|Rosemont, Illinois, United States
|
|-
|Win
|align=center|9–1 (1)
|Rob Kimmons
|Submission (rear-naked choke)
|UFC Fight Night: Diaz vs. Neer
|
|align=center|1
|align=center|1:27
|Omaha, Nebraska, United States
|
|-
|Win
|align=center|8–1 (1)
|Ryan McGivern
|Submission (kneebar)
|IFL: Connecticut
|
|align=center|1
|align=center|3:36
|Uncasville, Connecticut, United States
|
|-
| NC
|align=center|7–1 (1)
|Mike Geurin
|No Contest (headbutt)
|Ring of Combat 18
|
|align=center|1
|align=center|0:34
|Atlantic City, New Jersey, United States
|
|-
|Win
|align=center|7–1
|John Howard
|Decision (unanimous)
|Ring of Combat 17: Beast of the Northeast Finals
|
|align=center|3
|align=center|5:00
|Atlantic City, New Jersey, United States
|
|-
|Win
|align=center|6–1
|Dave Phillips
|Submission (standing guillotine choke)
|IFL: 2007 Semifinals
|
|align=center|1
|align=center|1:30
|East Rutherford, New Jersey, United States
|
|-
|Win
|align=center|5–1
|Jose Rodriguez
|Decision (unanimous)
|Cage Fury Fighting Championships 4
|
|align=center|3
|align=center|5:00
|Atlantic City, New Jersey, United States
|
|-
|Win
|align=center|4–1
|Lance Everson
|Submission (rear-naked choke)
|Cage Fury Fighting Championships 2
|
|align=center|1
|align=center|2:26
|Atlantic City, New Jersey, United States
|
|-
|Win
|align=center|3–1
|Dave Perez
|TKO (corner stoppage)
|Cage Fury Fighting Championships 1
|
|align=center|1
|align=center|5:00
|Atlantic City, New Jersey, United States
|
|-
|Loss
|align=center|2–1
|Mike Massenzio
|Decision (split)
|Reality Fighting 12: Return to Boardwalk Hall
|
|align=center|3
|align=center|5:00
|Atlantic City, New Jersey, United States
|
|-
|Win
|align=center|2–0
|Jay Coleman
|Submission (armbar)
|Reality Fighting 11: Battle at Taj Mahal
|
|align=center|1
|align=center|N/A
|Atlantic City, New Jersey, United States
|
|-
|Win
|align=center|1–0
|Tenyeh Dixon
|Submission (triangle choke)
|Reality Fighting 10
|
|align=center|1
|align=center|2:20
|Atlantic City, New Jersey, United States
|

See also
 List of current UFC fighters
 List of male mixed martial artists

References

External links 
Official Site
UFC profile

American male mixed martial artists
Middleweight mixed martial artists
Mixed martial artists utilizing wrestling
Mixed martial artists utilizing Brazilian jiu-jitsu
1981 births
Living people
Mixed martial artists from New Jersey
American practitioners of Brazilian jiu-jitsu
People awarded a black belt in Brazilian jiu-jitsu
People from Sparta, New Jersey
People from Hanover Township, New Jersey
Sportspeople from Sussex County, New Jersey
Ultimate Fighting Championship male fighters